Ruginoasa is a commune in Iași County, Western Moldavia, Romania. It is composed of four villages: Dumbrăvița, Rediu, Ruginoasa and Vascani.

Natives
Gheorghe I. Brătianu

References

Communes in Iași County
Localities in Western Moldavia